Dutch is a West Germanic language spoken by about 25 million people as a first language and 5 million as a second language. It is the third most widely spoken Germanic language, after its close relatives German and English. Afrikaans is a separate but somewhat mutually intelligible daughter language spoken, to some degree, by at least 16 million people, mainly in South Africa and Namibia, evolving from the Cape Dutch dialects of Southern Africa. The dialects used in Belgium (including Flemish) and in Suriname, meanwhile, are all guided by the Dutch Language Union.

In Europe, most of the population of the Netherlands (where it is the only official language spoken countrywide) and about 60% of the population of Belgium (as one of three official languages) speak Dutch. Outside the Low Countries, Dutch is the native language of the majority of the population of the South American country of Suriname, a former Dutch colony, where it also holds an official status, as it does in the Caribbean island countries of Aruba, Curaçao and Sint Maarten, which are constituent countries of the Kingdom of the Netherlands.  Up to half a million native speakers reside in the United States, Canada and Australia combined, and historical linguistic minorities on the verge of extinction remain in parts of France, Germany and Indonesia. 

Dutch is one of the closest relatives of both German and English and is colloquially said to be "roughly in between" them. Dutch, like English, has not undergone the High German consonant shift, does not use Germanic umlaut as a grammatical marker, has largely abandoned the use of the subjunctive, and has levelled much of its morphology, including most of its case system. Features shared with German include the survival of two to three grammatical genders—albeit with few grammatical consequences—as well as the use of modal particles, final-obstruent devoicing, and a similar word order. Dutch vocabulary is mostly Germanic; it incorporates slightly more Romance loans than German but far fewer than English.

Name

In both Belgium and the Netherlands, the native official name for Dutch is Nederlands (historically  before the Dutch orthographic reforms). Sometimes Vlaams ("Flemish") is used as well to describe Standard Dutch in Flanders, whereas Hollands ("Hollandic") is occasionally used as a colloquial term for the standard language in the central and northwestern parts of the Netherlands. 

English is the only language to use the adjective Dutch for the language of the Netherlands and Flanders or something else from the Netherlands. The word is derived from Proto-Germanic . In this sense, it meant  "the language of the common people". The term was used as opposed to Latin, the non-native language of writing and the Catholic Church. It was first recorded in 786, when the Bishop of Ostia writes to Pope Adrian I about a synod taking place in Corbridge, England, where the decisions are being written down "tam Latine quam theodisce" meaning "in Latin as well as common vernacular". 

In northwestern West Francia (i.e. modern-day Belgium) the term would take on a new meaning during the Early Middle Ages, when, within the context of a highly dichromatic linguistic landscape, it came to be the antonym of *walhisk (Romance-speakers, specifically Old French). The word, now rendered as dietsc (Southwestern variant) or duutsc (Central and Northern Variant), could refer to the Dutch language itself, as well as a broader Germanic category depending on context. During the High Middle Ages "Dietsc/Duutsc" was increasingly used as an umbrella term for the specific Germanic dialects spoken in the Low Countries, its meaning being largely implicitly provided by the regional orientation of medieval Dutch society: apart from the higher echelons of the clergy and nobility, mobility was largely static and hence while "Dutch" could by extension also be used in its earlier sense, referring to what to today would be called Germanic dialects as opposed to Romance dialects, in many cases it was understood or meant to refer to the language now known as Dutch. 

In the Low Countries Dietsch or its Early Modern Dutch form Duytsch as an endonym for Dutch gradually went out of common use and was gradually replaced by the Dutch endonym Nederlands. This designation (first attested in 1482) started at the Burgundian court in the 15th century, although the use of neder, laag, bas, and inferior ("nether" or "low") to refer to the area known as the Low Countries goes back further in time, with the Romans referring to the region as Germania Inferior ("Lower" Germania). It is a reference to the Low Countries' downriver location at the Rhine–Meuse–Scheldt delta near the North Sea.

From 1551, the designation Nederlands received strong competition from the name Nederduytsch (literally "Low Dutch",  Dutch being used in its archaic sense covering all continental West Germanic languages). It is a calque of the aforementioned Roman province Germania Inferior and an attempt by early Dutch grammarians to give their language more prestige by linking it to Roman times. Likewise, Hoogduits ("High German") and Overlands ("Upper-landish") came into use as a Dutch exonym for the various German dialects used in neighboring German states. Use of Nederduytsch was popular in the 16th century but ultimately lost out over Nederlands during the close of the 18th century, with (Hoog)Duytsch establishing itself as the Dutch exonym for German during this same period. 

In the 19th century Germany saw the rise of the categorisation of dialects, with German dialectologists terming the German dialects spoken in the mountainous south of Germany as Hochdeutsch ("High German"). Subsequently, German dialects spoken in the north were designated as Niederdeutsch ("Low German"). The names for these dialects were calqued by Dutch linguists as Nederduits and Hoogduits. As a result, Nederduits no longer serves as a synonym for the Dutch language. In the 19th century, the term "Diets" was revived by Dutch linguists and historians as well, as a poetic name for Middle Dutch and its literature.

History

Old Dutch can be discerned more or less around the same time as Old English (Anglo-Saxon), Old High German, Old Frisian, and Old Saxon. These names are derived from the modern standard languages. In this age no standard languages had yet developed, while a perfect West Germanic dialect continuum remained present; the division reflects the contingent future contribution dialect groups would have to the later languages. The early form of Dutch was a set of Franconian dialects spoken by the Salian Franks in the 5th century. These happened to develop through Middle Dutch to Modern Dutch over the course of fifteen centuries. During that period, they forced Old Frisian back from the western coast to the north of the Low Countries, and influenced or even replaced Old Saxon spoken in the east (contiguous with the Low German area). On the other hand, Dutch has been replaced in adjacent lands in present-day France and Germany. The division into Old, Middle and Modern Dutch is mostly conventional, since the transition between them was very gradual. One of the few moments when linguists can detect something of a revolution is when the Dutch standard language emerged and quickly established itself. The development of the Dutch language is illustrated by the following sentence in Old, Middle and Modern Dutch:
 Irlôsin sol an frithe sêla mîna fan thên thia ginâcont mi, wanda under managon he was mit mi (Old Dutch)
 Erlossen sal [hi] in vrede siele mine van dien die genaken mi, want onder menegen hi was met mi (Middle Dutch)
 Verlossen zal hij in vrede ziel mijn van degenen die genaken mij, want onder menigen hij was met mij (Modern Dutch, same word order)
 Hij zal mijn ziel in vrede verlossen van degenen die mij genaken, want onder menigen was hij met mij (Modern Dutch, default word order)
 He will deliver my soul in peace from those who approach me, because, amongst many, he was with me (English)

Origins

Among the Indo-European languages, Dutch is grouped within the Germanic languages, meaning it shares a common ancestor with languages such as English, German, and the Scandinavian languages. All Germanic languages are subject to the Grimm's law and Verner's law sound shifts, which originated in the Proto-Germanic language and define the basic features differentiating them from other Indo-European languages. This is assumed to have taken place in approximately the mid-first millennium BCE in the pre-Roman Northern European Iron Age.

The Germanic languages are traditionally divided into three groups: East (now extinct), West, and North Germanic. They remained mutually intelligible throughout the Migration Period. Dutch is part of the West Germanic group, which also includes English, Scots, Frisian, Low German (Old Saxon) and High German. It is characterized by a number of phonological and morphological innovations not found in North or East Germanic. The West Germanic varieties of the time are generally split into three dialect groups: Ingvaeonic (North Sea Germanic), Istvaeonic (Weser-Rhine Germanic) and Irminonic (Elbe Germanic). It appears that the Frankish tribes fit primarily into the Istvaeonic dialect group with certain Ingvaeonic influences towards the northwest, which are still seen in modern Dutch.

Frankish (3rd–5th centuries)

The Frankish language itself is not directly attested, the only possible exception being the Bergakker inscription, found near the Dutch city of Tiel, which may represent a primary record of 5th-century Frankish. However, interpretations of the rest of the text lack any consensus.

The Franks emerged in the southern Netherlands (Salian Franks) and central Germany (Ripuarian Franks), and later descended into Gaul. The name of their kingdom survives in that of France. Although they ruled the Gallo-Romans for nearly 300 years, their language, Frankish, became extinct in most of France and was replaced by later forms of the language throughout Luxembourg and Germany in around the 7th century. It was replaced in France by Old French (a Romance language with a considerable Old Frankish influence).

However, the Old Franconian language did not die out at large, as it continued to be spoken in the Low Countries, and subsequently evolved into what is now called Old Low Franconian or Old Dutch in the Low Countries. In fact, Old Frankish could be reconstructed from Old Dutch and Frankish loanwords in Old French.

Old Dutch (5th–12th centuries) 

The term Old Dutch or Old Low Franconian refers to the set of Franconian dialects (i.e. West Germanic varieties that are assumed to have evolved from Frankish) spoken in the Low Countries during the Early Middle Ages, from around the 5th to the 12th century. Old Dutch is mostly recorded on fragmentary relics, and words have been reconstructed from Middle Dutch and Old Dutch loanwords in French. Old Dutch is regarded as the primary stage in the development of a separate Dutch language. It was spoken by the descendants of the Salian Franks who occupied what is now the southern Netherlands, northern Belgium, part of northern France, and parts of the Lower Rhine regions of Germany.

The High German consonant shift, moving over Western Europe from south to west, caused a differentiation with the Central and High Franconian in Germany. The latter would as a consequence evolve (along with Alemannic, Bavarian and Lombardic) into Old High German. At more or less the same time the Ingvaeonic nasal spirant law, moving over Western Europe from west to east, led to the development of Old English (or Anglo-Saxon), Old Frisian and Old Saxon. Hardly influenced by either development, Old Dutch probably remained relatively close to the original language of the Franks. However, the language did experience developments of its own, such as very early final-obstruent devoicing. In fact, the find at Bergakker indicates that the language may already have experienced this shift during the Old Frankish period.

Attestations of Old Dutch sentences are extremely rare. The language is mostly recorded on fragmentary relics, and words have been reconstructed from Middle Dutch and loan words from Old Dutch in other languages. The oldest recorded is found in the Salic law. In this Frankish document written around 510 the oldest Dutch sentence has been identified: Maltho thi afrio lito ("I say to you, I free you, serf") used to free a serf. Another old fragment of Dutch is Visc flot aftar themo uuatare ("A fish was swimming in the water"). The oldest conserved larger Dutch text is the Utrecht baptismal vow (776–800) starting with Forsachistu diobolae ... ec forsacho diabolae (litt.: "Forsake you the devil? ... I forsake the devil"). If only for its poetic content, the most famous Old Dutch sentence is probably Hebban olla vogala nestas hagunnan, hinase hic enda tu, wat unbidan we nu ("All birds have started making nests, except me and you, what are we waiting for"), is dated to around the year 1100, written by a Flemish monk in a convent in Rochester, England. Since the sentence speaks to the imagination, it is often erroneously stated as the oldest Dutch sentence.

Middle Dutch (12th–15th centuries)

Old Dutch naturally evolved into Middle Dutch. The year 1150 is often cited as the time of the discontinuity, but it actually marks a time of profuse Dutch writing; during this period a rich Medieval Dutch literature developed. There was at that time no overarching standard language; Middle Dutch is rather a collective name for a number of closely related, mutually intelligible dialects spoken in the former Old Dutch area. Where Old Dutch fragments are very hard to read for untrained Modern Dutch speakers, the various literary works of Middle Dutch are somewhat more accessible. The most notable difference between Old and Middle Dutch is in a feature of speech known as vowel reduction. Round vowels in word-final syllables are rather frequent in Old Dutch; in Middle Dutch, such vowels are leveled to a schwa.

The Middle Dutch dialect areas were affected by political boundaries. The sphere of political influence of a certain ruler often also created a sphere of linguistic influence, with the language within the area becoming more homogenous. Following the contemporary political divisions they are in order of importance:
 West Flemish with the County of Flanders at its centre. It had been influential during the earlier Middle Ages (the "Flemish expansion") but lost prestige to the neighbouring Brabantian in the 13th century.
 Brabantian (and related East Flemish), spoken primarily in the Duchy of Brabant and adjacent parts. It was an influential dialect during most of the Middle Ages, during the so-called "Brabantian expansion" in which the influence of Brabant was extended outwards into other areas.
 Hollandic, which had the County of Holland as its heartland, where originally Old Frisian was spoken. The people adopted Low Franconian and a new Frankish dialect with a Frisian substrate developed. It was less influential during most of the Middle Ages but became more so in the 16th century during the "Hollandic expansion"; the Eighty Years' War took place in the Southern Netherlands during this period.
 Limburgish, spoken by the people in the modern-day provinces of Dutch and Belgian Limburg, and adjacent lands in Germany. It was over time tied to different political areas and is therefore the most divergent of the dialects. It was even partly influenced by the High German consonant shift and is the most distant to the later developed standard language to which it contributed little. It was, however, the earliest Middle Dutch dialect that developed a literary tradition.
 Since it is part of the Old Saxon and not Low Franconian (Old Dutch) area, Dutch Low Saxon is not strictly a Dutch dialect. However, it was influenced by Middle Dutch since the 14th century and it did play a part in the formation of the standard Dutch language in later periods. It was spoken in the Oversticht territories of the episcopal principality of Utrecht and adjacent parts of Guelders. A dialect continuum remained present with Franconian areas to the west and Low Saxon areas to the east.

Modern Dutch (15th century–present)

A process of standardisation started in the Middle Ages, especially under the influence of the Burgundian Ducal Court in Dijon (Brussels after 1477). The dialects of Flanders and Brabant were the most influential around this time. The process of standardisation became much stronger at the start of the 16th century, mainly based on the urban dialect of Antwerp. The 1585 fall of Antwerp to the Spanish army led to a flight to the northern Netherlands, where the Dutch Republic declared its independence from Spain. This influenced the urban dialects of the province of Holland. In 1637, a further important step was made towards a unified language, when the Statenvertaling, the first major Bible translation into Dutch, was created that people from all over the new republic could understand. It used elements from various, even Dutch Low Saxon, dialects but was predominantly based on the urban dialects of Holland of post 16th century.

In the Southern Netherlands (now Belgium and Luxembourg), developments were different. Under subsequent Spanish, Austrian and French rule, the standardisation of Dutch language came to a standstill. The state, law, and increasingly education used French, yet more than half the Belgian population were speaking a variety of Dutch. In the course of the 19th century, the Flemish Movement stood up for the rights of Dutch speakers, mostly referred to as "Flemish". However, the dialect variation was a serious disadvantage in the face of the standardised francophony. Since standardisation is a lengthy process, Dutch-speaking Belgium associated itself with the standard language that had already developed in the Netherlands over the centuries. Therefore, the situation in Belgium is essentially no different from that in the Netherlands, although there are recognisable differences in pronunciation, comparable to the pronunciation differences between standard British and standard American English. In 1980 the Netherlands and Belgium concluded the Language Union Treaty. This treaty lays down the principle that the two countries must gear their language policy to each other, among other things, for a common system of spelling.

Classification

 Indo-European languages
 Germanic
 West Germanic
 Low Franconian
 Dutch
 Afrikaans, Dutch-based creoles

Dutch belongs to its own West Germanic sub-group, the Low Franconian languages, paired with its sister language Limburgish or East Low Franconian. Its closest relative is the mutually intelligible daughter language Afrikaans. Other West Germanic languages related to Dutch are German, English and the Frisian languages and the un-standardised languages Low German and Yiddish.

Dutch stands out in combining some Ingvaeonic characteristics (occurring consistently in English and Frisian and reduced in intensity from west to east over the continental West Germanic plane) with dominant Istvaeonic characteristics, some of which are also incorporated in German. Unlike German, Dutch (apart from Limburgish) has not been influenced at all by the south to north movement of the High German consonant shift and had some changes of its own. The cumulation of these changes resulted over time in separate, but related standard languages with various degrees of similarities and differences between them. For a comparison between the West Germanic languages, see the sections Morphology, Grammar and Vocabulary.

Dialects

Dutch dialects are primarily the dialects that are both related with the Dutch language and are spoken in the same language area as the Dutch standard language. Although heavily under the influence of the standard language, some of them remain remarkably diverse and are found in the Netherlands and in the Brussels and Flemish regions of Belgium. The areas in which they are spoken often correspond with former mediaeval counties and duchies. The Netherlands (but not Belgium) distinguishes between a dialect and a streektaal ("regional language"). Those words are actually more political than linguistic because a regional language unites a large group of very different varieties. Such is the case with the Gronings dialect, which is considered a variety of the Dutch Low Saxon regional language, but it is relatively distinct from other Dutch Low Saxon varieties. Also, some Dutch dialects are more remote from the Dutch standard language than some varieties of a regional language are. Within the Netherlands, a further distinction is made between a regional language and a separate language, which is the case with the (standardised) West Frisian language. It is spoken alongside Dutch in the province of Friesland.

Dutch dialects and regional languages are not spoken as often as they used to be, especially in the Netherlands. Recent research by Geert Driessen shows that the use of dialects and regional languages among both Dutch adults and youth is in heavy decline. In 1995, 27 percent of the Dutch adult population spoke a dialect or regional language on a regular basis, but in 2011, that was no more than 11 percent. In 1995, 12 percent of children of primary school age spoke a dialect or regional language, but in 2011, that had declined to 4 percent. Of the officially recognized regional languages Limburgish is spoken the most (in 2011 among adults 54%, among children 31%) and Dutch Low Saxon the least (adults 15%, children 1%). The decline of the West Frisian language in Friesland occupies a middle position (adults 44%, children 22%). Dialects are most often spoken in rural areas, but many cities have a distinct city dialect. For example, the city of Ghent has very distinct "g", "e" and "r" sounds that greatly differ from its surrounding villages. The Brussels dialect combines Brabantian with words adopted from Walloon and French.

Some dialects had, until recently, extensions across the borders of other standard language areas. In most cases, the heavy influence of the standard language has broken the dialect continuum. Examples are the Gronings dialect spoken in Groningen as well as the closely related varieties in adjacent East Frisia (Germany). South Guelderish (Zuid-Gelders) is a dialect spoken in southern Gelderland, the northern tip of Limburg, and northeast of North Brabant (Netherlands), but also in adjacent parts of North Rhine-Westphalia (Germany). Limburgish (Limburgs) is spoken in Limburg (Belgium) as well as in the remaining part of Limburg (Netherlands) and extends across the German border. West Flemish (Westvlaams) is spoken in West Flanders, the western part of Zeelandic Flanders and also in French Flanders, where it virtually became extinct to make way for French.

Dialect groups

The West Flemish group of dialects, spoken in West Flanders and Zeeland, is so distinct that it might be considered as a separate language variant, although the strong significance of language in Belgian politics would prevent the government from classifying them as such. An oddity of the dialect is that, the voiced velar fricative (written as "g" in Dutch) shifts to a voiced glottal fricative (written as "h" in Dutch), while the letter "h" becomes mute (like in French). As a result, when West Flemings try to talk Standard Dutch, they are often unable to pronounce the g-sound, and pronounce it similar to the h-sound. This leaves, for example, no difference between "held" (hero) and "geld" (money). Or in some cases, they are aware of the problem, and hyper-correct the "h" into a voiced velar fricative or g-sound, again leaving no difference. The West Flemish variety historically spoken in adjacent parts in France is sometimes called French Flemish and is listed as a French minority language. However, only a very small and aging minority of the French-Flemish population still speaks and understands West Flemish.

Hollandic is spoken in Holland and Utrecht, though the original forms of this dialect (which were heavily influenced by a West Frisian substratum and, from the 16th century on, by Brabantian dialects) are now relatively rare. The urban dialects of the Randstad, which are Hollandic dialects, do not diverge from standard Dutch very much, but there is a clear difference between the city dialects of Rotterdam, The Hague, Amsterdam and Utrecht. In some rural Hollandic areas more authentic Hollandic dialects are still being used, especially north of Amsterdam. Another group of dialects based on Hollandic is that spoken in the cities and larger towns of Friesland, where it partially displaced West Frisian in the 16th century and is known as Stadsfries ("Urban Frisian"). Hollandic together with inter alia South Guelderish and North Brabantian, but without Stadsfries, are the Central Dutch dialects.

Brabantian is named after the historical Duchy of Brabant, which corresponded mainly to the provinces of North Brabant and southern Gelderland, the Belgian provinces of Antwerp and Flemish Brabant, as well as Brussels (where its native speakers have become a minority) and the province of Walloon Brabant. Brabantian expands into small parts in the west of Limburg while its strong influence on the East Flemish of East Flanders and eastern Zeelandic Flanders weakens towards the west. In a small area in the northwest of North Brabant (Willemstad), Hollandic is spoken. Conventionally, the South Guelderish dialects are distinguished from Brabantian, but there are no objective criteria apart from geography to do so. Over 5 million people live in an area with some form of Brabantian being the predominant colloquial language out of the area's 22 million Dutch-speakers.

Limburgish, spoken in both Belgian Limburg and Netherlands Limburg and in adjacent parts in Germany, is considered a dialect in Belgium, while having obtained the official status of regional language in the Netherlands.  Limburgish has been influenced by the Ripuarian varieties like the Colognian dialect, and has had a somewhat different development since the late Middle Ages.

Regional languages
Two dialect groups have been given the official status of regional language (or streektaal) in the Netherlands. Like several other dialect groups, both are part of a dialect continuum that continues across the national border.

Dutch Low Saxon

The Dutch Low Saxon dialect area comprises the provinces of Groningen, Drenthe and Overijssel, as well as parts of the provinces of Gelderland, Flevoland, Friesland and Utrecht. This group, which is not Low Franconian but instead Low Saxon and close to neighbouring Low German, has been elevated by the Netherlands (and by Germany) to the legal status of streektaal (regional language) according to the European Charter for Regional or Minority Languages. It is regarded as Dutch for a number of reasons. From the 14th to 15th century onward, its urban centers (Deventer, Zwolle, Kampen, Zutphen and Doesburg) have been increasingly influenced by the western written Dutch and became a linguistically mixed area. From the 17th century onward, it was gradually integrated into the Dutch language area. Dutch Low Saxon used to be at one end of the Low German dialect continuum. However, the national border has given way to dialect boundaries coinciding with a political border, because the traditional dialects are strongly influenced by the national standard varieties. Cross-the-border dialects now separated by a plain gap also include South Guelderish and Limburgish on the Dutch side of the border and Meuse-Rhenish on the German side of the border.

Limburgish

While a somewhat heterogeneous group of Low Franconian dialects, Limburgish has received official status as a regional language in the Netherlands and Germany, but not in Belgium. Due to this official recognition, it receives protection by chapter 2 of the European Charter for Regional or Minority Languages.

Daughter and sister languages
Afrikaans, although to a significant degree mutually intelligible with Dutch, is not a dialect but a separate standardised language. It is spoken in South Africa and Namibia. As a daughter language of Dutch, Afrikaans evolved mainly from 17th-century Dutch dialects, but was influenced by various other languages in South Africa.

West Frisian (Westerlauwers Fries), along with Saterland Frisian and North Frisian, evolved from the same branch of the West Germanic languages as Old English (i.e. Anglo-Frisian) and are therefore genetically more closely related to English and Scots than to Dutch. The different influences on the respective languages, however, particularly that of Norman French on English and Dutch on West Frisian, have rendered English quite distinct from West Frisian, and West Frisian less distinct from Dutch than from English. Although under heavy influence of the Dutch standard language, it is not mutually intelligible with Dutch and considered a sister language of Dutch, like English and German.

Geographic distribution

Dutch is an official language of the Netherlands proper, Belgium, Suriname, the Dutch Caribbean municipalities (St. Eustatius, Saba and Bonaire), Aruba, Curaçao and Sint Maarten. Dutch is also an official language of several international organisations, such as the European Union, Union of South American Nations and the Caribbean Community. At an academic level, Dutch is taught in about 175 universities in 40 countries. About 15,000 students worldwide study Dutch at university.

Europe 
In Europe, Dutch is the majority language in the Netherlands (96%) and Belgium (59%) as well as a minority language in Germany and northern France's French Flanders. Though Belgium as a whole is multilingual, three of the four language areas into which the country is divided (Flanders, francophone Wallonia, and the German-speaking Community) are largely monolingual, with Brussels being bilingual. The Netherlands and Belgium produce the vast majority of music, films, books and other media written or spoken in Dutch. Dutch is a monocentric language, at least what concerns its written form, with all speakers using the same standard form (authorized by the Dutch Language Union) based on a Dutch orthography defined in the so-called "Green Booklet" authoritative dictionary and employing the Latin alphabet when writing; however, pronunciation varies between dialects. Indeed, in stark contrast to its written uniformity, Dutch lacks a unique prestige dialect and has a large dialectal continuum consisting of 28 main dialects, which can themselves be further divided into at least 600 distinguishable varieties. In the Netherlands, the Hollandic dialect dominates in national broadcast media while in Flanders Brabantian dialect dominates in that capacity, making them in turn unofficial prestige dialects in their respective countries.

Outside the Netherlands and Belgium, the dialect spoken in and around the German town of Kleve (South Guelderish) is historically and genetically a Low Franconian variety. In North-Western France, the area around Calais was historically Dutch-speaking (West Flemish), of which an estimated 20,000 are daily speakers. The cities of Dunkirk, Gravelines and Bourbourg only became predominantly French-speaking by the end of the 19th century. In the countryside, until World War I, many elementary schools continued to teach in Dutch, and the Catholic Church continued to preach and teach the catechism in Dutch in many parishes.

During the second half of the 19th century, Dutch was banned from all levels of education by both Prussia and France and lost most of its functions as a cultural language. In both Germany and France, the Dutch standard language is largely absent, and speakers of these Dutch dialects will use German or French in everyday speech. Dutch is not afforded legal status in France or Germany, either by the central or regional public authorities, and knowledge of the language is declining among younger generations.

As a foreign language, Dutch is mainly taught in primary and secondary schools in areas adjacent to the Netherlands and Flanders. In French-speaking Belgium, over 300,000 pupils are enrolled in Dutch courses, followed by over 23,000 in the German states of Lower Saxony and North Rhine-Westphalia, and about 7,000 in the French region of Nord-Pas-de-Calais (of which 4,550 are in primary school). At an academic level, the largest number of faculties of neerlandistiek can be found in Germany (30 universities), followed by France (20 universities) and the United Kingdom (5 universities).

Asia and Australasia

Asia

Despite the Dutch presence in Indonesia for almost 350 years, as the Asian bulk of the Dutch East Indies, the Dutch language has no official status there and the small minority that can speak the language fluently are either educated members of the oldest generation, or employed in the legal profession such as historians, diplomats, lawyers, jurists and linguists/polyglots, as certain law codes are still only available in Dutch. Dutch is taught in various educational centres in Indonesia, the most important of which is the Erasmus Language Centre (ETC) in Jakarta. Each year, some 1,500 to 2,000 students take Dutch courses there. In total, several thousand Indonesians study Dutch as a foreign language. Owing to centuries of Dutch rule in Indonesia, many old documents are written in Dutch. Many universities therefore include Dutch as a source language, mainly for law and history students. In Indonesia this involves about 35,000 students.

Unlike other European nations, the Dutch chose not to follow a policy of language expansion amongst the indigenous peoples of their colonies. In the last quarter of the 19th century, however, a local elite gained proficiency in Dutch so as to meet the needs of expanding bureaucracy and business. Nevertheless, the Dutch government remained reluctant to teach Dutch on a large scale for fear of destabilising the colony. Dutch, the language of power, was supposed to remain in the hands of the leading elite.

After independence, Dutch was dropped as an official language and replaced by Malay. Yet the Indonesian language inherited many words from Dutch: words for everyday life as well as scientific and technological terms. One scholar argues that 20% of Indonesian words can be traced back to Dutch words, many of which are transliterated to reflect phonetic pronunciation e.g.  "office" in Indonesian is kantor, handdoek "towel" in Indonesian is handuk, or bushalte "bus stop" in Indonesian is halte bus. In addition, many Indonesian words are calques of Dutch; for example, rumah sakit "hospital" is calqued on the Dutch ziekenhuis (literally "sickhouse"), kebun binatang "zoo" on dierentuin (literally "animal garden"), undang-undang dasar "constitution" from grondwet (literally "ground law"). These account for some of the differences in vocabulary between Indonesian and Malay. Some regional languages in Indonesia have some Dutch loanwords as well; for example, Sundanese word Katel or "frying pan" origin in Dutch is "ketel". The Javanese word for "bike/bicycle" "pit" can be traced back to its origin in Dutch "fiets".

Australasia
After the declaration of independence of Indonesia, Western New Guinea, the "wild east" of the Dutch East Indies, remained a Dutch colony until 1962, known as Netherlands New Guinea. Despite prolonged Dutch presence, the Dutch language is not spoken by many Papuans, the colony having been ceded to Indonesia in 1963.

Dutch-speaking immigrant communities can also be found in Australia and New Zealand. The 2011 Australian census showed 37,248 people speaking Dutch at home. At the 2006 New Zealand census, 26,982 people, or 0.70 percent of the total population, reported to speak Dutch to sufficient fluency that they could hold an everyday conversation.

Americas 

In contrast to the colonies in the East Indies, from the second half of the 19th century onwards, the Netherlands envisaged the expansion of Dutch in its colonies in the West Indies. Until 1863, when slavery was abolished in the West Indies, slaves were forbidden to speak Dutch, with the effect that local creoles such as Papiamento and Sranan Tongo which were based not on Dutch but rather other European languages, became common in the Dutch West Indies. However, as most of the people in the Colony of Surinam (now Suriname) worked on Dutch plantations, this reinforced the use of Dutch as a means for direct communication.

In Suriname today, Dutch is the sole official language, and over 60 percent of the population speaks it as a mother tongue. Dutch is the obligatory medium of instruction in schools in Suriname, even for non-native speakers. A further twenty-four percent of the population speaks Dutch as a second language. Suriname gained its independence from the Netherlands in 1975 and has been an associate member of the Dutch Language Union since 2004. The lingua franca of Suriname, however, is Sranan Tongo, spoken natively by about a fifth of the population.

In Aruba, Bonaire, Curaçao and Sint Maarten, all parts of the Kingdom of the Netherlands, Dutch is the official language but spoken as a first language by only 7% to 8% of the population, although most native-born people on the islands can speak the language since the education system is in Dutch at some or all levels.

In the United States, a now extinct dialect of Dutch, Jersey Dutch, spoken by descendants of 17th-century Dutch settlers in Bergen and Passaic counties, was still spoken as late as 1921. Other Dutch-based creole languages once spoken in the Americas include Mohawk Dutch (in Albany, New York), Berbice (in Guyana), Skepi (in Essequibo, Guyana) and Negerhollands (in the United States Virgin Islands). Pennsylvania Dutch is not a member of the set of Dutch dialects and is less misleadingly called Pennsylvania German.

Martin Van Buren, the eighth President of the United States, spoke Dutch natively and is the only U.S. president whose first language was not English. Dutch prevailed for many generations as the dominant language in parts of New York along the Hudson River. Another famous American born in this region who spoke Dutch as a first language was Sojourner Truth.

According to the 2000 United States census, 150,396 people spoke Dutch at home, while according to the 2006 Canadian census, this number reaches 160,000 Dutch speakers. At an academic level, 20 universities offer Dutch studies in the United States. In Canada, Dutch is the fourth most spoken language by farmers, after English, French and German, and the fifth most spoken non-official language overall (by 0.6% of Canadians).

Africa 

The largest legacy of the Dutch language lies in South Africa, which attracted large numbers of Dutch, Flemish and other northwest European farmer (in Dutch, boer) settlers, all of whom were quickly assimilated. The long isolation from the rest of the Dutch-speaking world made the Dutch as spoken in Southern Africa evolve into what is now Afrikaans. In 1876, the first Afrikaans newspaper called Die Afrikaanse Patriot was published in the Cape Colony.

European Dutch remained the literary language until the start of the 1920s, when under pressure of Afrikaner nationalism the local "African" Dutch was preferred over the written, European-based standard. In 1925, section 137 of the 1909 constitution of the Union of South Africa was amended by Act 8 of 1925, stating "the word Dutch in article 137 ... is hereby declared to include Afrikaans". The constitution of 1983 only listed English and Afrikaans as official languages. It is estimated that between 90% to 95% of Afrikaans vocabulary is ultimately of Dutch origin.

Both languages are still largely mutually intelligible, although this relation can in some fields (such as lexicon, spelling and grammar) be asymmetric, as it is easier for Dutch speakers to understand written Afrikaans than it is for Afrikaans speakers to understand written Dutch. Afrikaans is grammatically far less complex than Dutch, and vocabulary items are generally altered in a clearly patterned manner, e.g. vogel becomes voël ("bird") and regen becomes reën ("rain"). In South Africa, the number of students following Dutch at university is difficult to estimate, since the academic study of Afrikaans inevitably includes the study of Dutch. Elsewhere in the world, the number of people learning Dutch is relatively small.

Afrikaans is the third largest language of South Africa in terms of native speakers (~13.5%), of whom 53% are Coloureds and 42.4% Whites. In 1996, 40 percent of South Africans reported to know Afrikaans at least at a very basic level of communication. It is the lingua franca in Namibia, where it is spoken natively in 11 percent of households. In total, Afrikaans is the first language in South Africa alone of about 7.1 million people and is estimated to be a second language for at least 10 million people worldwide, compared to over 23 million and 5 million respectively, for Dutch.

The Dutch colonial presence elsewhere in Africa, notably Dutch Gold Coast, was too ephemeral not to be wiped out by prevailing colonizing European successors. Belgian colonial presence in Congo and Rwanda-Urundi (Burundi and Rwanda, held under League of Nations mandate and later a UN trust territory) left little Dutch (Flemish) legacy, as French was the main colonial language.

Phonology

For further details on different realisations of phonemes, dialectal differences and example words, see the full article at Dutch phonology.

Consonants
Unlike other Germanic languages, Dutch has no phonological aspiration of consonants. Like most other Germanic languages, the Dutch consonant system did not undergo the High German consonant shift and has a syllable structure that allows fairly-complex consonant clusters. Dutch also retains full use of the velar fricatives of Proto-Germanic that were lost or modified in many other Germanic languages. Dutch has final-obstruent devoicing. At the end of a word, voicing distinction is neutralised and all obstruents are pronounced voiceless. Dutch shares this final-obstruent devoicing with German (the Dutch noun goud is pronounced [ɣɑut], the adjective gouden is pronounced [ɣɑudə(n)], like the German noun Gold, pronounced [ɡɔlt], adjective golden, pronounced [ɡɔldn] vs English gold and golden, both pronounced with [d].)

Voicing of pre-vocalic initial voiceless alveolar fricatives occurs although less in Dutch than in German (Dutch , German  with  versus English seven and Low German  with [s]), and also the shift  → . Dutch shares only with Low German the development of  →  (Dutch ,  and Low German ,  versus German ,  and English foxes, oxen), and also the development of  →  though it is far more common in Dutch (Dutch  and Low German  versus German  and English soft, but Dutch  versus German  and English craft).

Notes:
 The realization of  phoneme varies considerably from dialect to dialect and even between speakers in the same dialect area. Common realisations are an alveolar trill , alveolar tap , uvular trill , voiced uvular fricative , and alveolar approximant .
 The realization of  also varies somewhat by area and speaker. The main realisation is a labiodental approximant , but some speakers, particularly in the south, use a bilabial approximant  or a labiovelar approximant .
 The lateral  is slightly velarized postvocalically in most dialects, particularly in the north.
The more palatal realisations are common in southern areas, and uvulars are common in the north.
 Some northern dialects have a tendency to devoice all fricatives, regardless of environment, which is particularly common with  but can affect others as well.
  is not a native phoneme of Dutch and occurs only in borrowed words, like .

Vowels
Like English, Dutch did not develop i-mutation as a morphological marker and shares with most other Germanic languages the lengthening of short vowels in stressed open syllables, which has led to contrastive vowel length being used as a morphological marker. Dutch has an extensive vowel inventory. Vowels can be grouped as back rounded, front unrounded and front rounded. They are also traditionally distinguished by length or tenseness.

Vowel length is not always considered a distinctive feature in Dutch phonology because it normally occurs with changes in vowel quality. One feature or the other may be considered redundant, and some phonemic analyses prefer to treat it as an opposition of tenseness. However, even if it is not considered part of the phonemic opposition, the long/tense vowels are still realised as phonetically longer than their short counterparts. The changes in vowel quality are also not always the same in all dialects, some of which may be little difference at all, with length remaining the primary distinguishing feature. Although all older words pair vowel length with a change in vowel quality, new loanwords have reintroduced phonemic oppositions of length. Compare zonne(n)  ("suns") versus zone  ("zone") versus zonen  ("sons"), or kroes  ("mug") versus cruise  ("cruise").

Notes:
However, some recent loanwords have introduced distinctively-long , making the length distinction marginally phonemic.
 The long close-mid vowels  are realised as slightly closing diphthongs  in many northern dialects.
 The long open-mid vowels  occur only in a handful of loanwords, mostly from French.

Diphthongs

Unique to the development of Dutch is the collapse of older ol/ul/al + dental into ol + dental, followed by vocalisation of pre-consonantal /l/ and after a short vowel. That created the diphthong : Dutch goud, zout and bout corresponds with Low German Gold, Solt, Bolt; German Gold, Salz, Balt and English gold, salt, bolt. All three are the only ones commonly considered unique phonemes in Dutch.

All diphthongs end in a close vowel and are grouped here by their first element.

Phonotactics
The syllable structure of Dutch is (C)(C)(C)V(C)(C)(C)(C). Many words, as in English, begin with three consonants: straat  (street). There are words that end in four consonants: herfst  (autumn), ergst  (worst), interessantst  (most interesting), sterkst  (strongest), the last three of which are superlative adjectives.

The highest number of consonants in a single cluster is found in the word slechtstschrijvend  (writing worst), with seven consonant phonemes. angstschreeuw  (scream in fear) has six in a row.

Polder Dutch
A notable change in pronunciation has been occurring in younger generations in the Dutch provinces of Utrecht, North and South Holland, which has been dubbed "Polder Dutch" by Jan Stroop.

The change is interesting from a sociolinguistic point of view because it has apparently happened relatively recently, in the 1970s and was pioneered by older well-educated women from the upper middle classes. The lowering of the diphthongs has long been current in many Dutch dialects and is comparable to the English Great Vowel Shift and the diphthongisation of long high vowels in Modern High German, which had centuries earlier reached the state now found in Polder Dutch. Stroop theorizes that the lowering of open-mid to open diphthongs is a phonetically "natural" and inevitable development and that Dutch, after it had diphthongised the long high vowels like German and English, "should" have lowered the diphthongs like German and English as well.

Instead, he argues that the development has been artificially frozen in an "intermediate" state by the standardisation of Dutch pronunciation in the 16th century in which lowered diphthongs found in rural dialects were perceived as ugly by the educated classes and were accordingly declared substandard. Now, however, he thinks that the newly-affluent and independent women can afford to let that natural development take place in their speech. Stroop compares the role of Polder Dutch with the urban variety of British English pronunciation called Estuary English.

Among Belgian and Surinamese Dutch-speakers and speakers from other regions in the Netherlands, this vowel shift is not taking place.

Grammar

Dutch is grammatically similar to German, such as in syntax and verb morphology (for verb morphology in English verbs, Dutch and German, see Germanic weak verb and Germanic strong verb). Grammatical cases have largely become limited to pronouns and many set phrases. Inflected forms of the articles are often grace surnames and toponyms.

Standard Dutch uses three genders across natural and grammatical genders but for most non-Belgian speakers, masculine and feminine have merged to form the common gender (with de for "the"). The neuter (which uses het) remains distinct. This is similar to those of most Continental Scandinavian tongues. Less so than English, inflectional grammar (such as in adjectival and noun endings) has simplified.

Verbs and tenses
When grouped according to their conjugational class, Dutch has four main verb types: weak verbs, strong verbs, irregular verbs and mixed verbs.

Weak verbs are most numerous, constituting about 60% of all verbs. In these, the past tense and past participle are formed with a dental suffix:
 Weak verbs with past in -de
 Weak verbs with past in -te

Strong verbs are the second most numerous verb group. This group is characterised by a vowel alternation of the stem in the past tense and perfect participle. Dutch distinguishes between 7 classes, comprising almost all strong verbs, with some internal variants. Dutch has many 'half strong verbs': these have a weak past tense and a strong participle or a strong past tense and a weak participle. The following table shows the vowel alternations in more detail. It also shows the number of roots (bare verbs) that belong to each class, variants with a prefix are excluded.

There is an ongoing process of "weakening" of strong verbs. The verb "ervaren" (to experience) used to be strictly a class 6 strong verb, having the past tense "ervoer" and participle "ervaren", but the weak form "ervaarde" for both past tense and participle is currently also in use. Some other verbs that were originally strong such as "raden" (to guess) and "stoten" (to bump), have past tense forms "ried" and "stiet" that are at present far less common than their weakened forms; "raadde" and "stootte". In most examples of such weakened verbs that were originally strong, both their strong and weak formations are deemed correct.

Genders and cases
As in English, the case system of Dutch and the subjunctive have largely fallen out of use, and the system has generalised the dative over the accusative case for certain pronouns (NL: me, je; EN: me, you; LI: mi, di vs. DE: mich/mir, dich/dir). While standard Dutch has three grammatical genders, this has few consequences and the masculine and feminine gender are usually merged into a common gender in the Netherlands but not in Belgium (EN: none; NL/LI: common and neuter; in Belgium masculine, feminine and neuter is in use).

Modern Dutch has mostly lost its case system. However, certain idioms and expressions continue to include now archaic case declensions. The article has just two forms, de and het, more complex than English, which has only the. The use of the older inflected form den in the dative and accusative, as well as use of der in the dative, is restricted to numerous set phrases, surnames and toponyms. But some dialects still use both, particularly "der" is often used instead of "haar" (her).

In modern Dutch, the genitive articles des and der in the bottom line are commonly used in idioms. Other usage is typically considered archaic, poetic or stylistic. One must know whether a noun is masculine or feminine to use them correctly. In most circumstances, the preposition van, the middle line, is instead used, followed by the normal article de or het, and in that case it makes no difference whether a word is masculine or feminine. For the idiomatic use of the articles in the genitive, see for example:
 Masculine singular: "des duivels" (lit: "of the devil") (common proverbial meaning: Seething with rage)
 Feminine singular: het woordenboek der Friese taal ("the dictionary of the Frisian language")
 Neuter singular: de vrouw des huizes ("the lady of the house")
 Plural: de voortgang der werken ("the progress of (public) works")

In contemporary usage, the genitive case still occurs a little more often with plurals than with singulars, as the plural article is der for all genders and no special noun inflection must be taken account of. Der is commonly used in order to avoid reduplication of van, e.g. het merendeel der gedichten van de auteur instead of het merendeel van de gedichten van de auteur ("the bulk of the author's poems").

There is also a genitive form for the pronoun die/dat ("that [one], those [ones]"), namely diens for masculine and neuter singulars (occurrences of dier for feminine singular and all plurals are extremely rare). Although usually avoided in common speech, this form can be used instead of possessive pronouns to avoid confusion. Compare:

 Hij vertelde over zijn zoon en zijn vrouw. – He spoke about his son and his (own) wife.
 Hij vertelde over zijn zoon en diens vrouw. – He spoke about his son and the latter's wife.

Analogically, the relative and interrogative pronoun wie ("who") has the genitive forms wiens and wier (corresponding to English whose, but less frequent in use).

Dutch also has a range of fixed expressions that make use of the genitive articles, which can be abbreviated using apostrophes. Common examples include "'s ochtends" (with 's as abbreviation of des; "in the morning") and desnoods (lit: "of the need", translated: "if necessary").

The Dutch written grammar has simplified over the past 100 years: cases are now mainly used for the pronouns, such as ik (I), mij, me (me), mijn (my), wie (who), wiens (whose: masculine or neuter singular), wier (whose: feminine singular; masculine, feminine or neuter plural). Nouns and adjectives are not case inflected (except for the genitive of proper nouns (names): -s, -'s or -'). In the spoken language cases and case inflections had already gradually disappeared from a much earlier date on (probably the 15th century) as in many continental West Germanic dialects.

Inflection of adjectives is more complicated. The adjective receives no ending with indefinite neuter nouns in singular (as with een  'a/an'), and -e in all other cases. (This was also the case in Middle English, as in "a goode man".) Fiets belongs to the masculine/feminine category, while water and huis are neuter.

An adjective has no e if it is in the predicative: De soep is koud.

More complex inflection is still found in certain lexicalized expressions like de heer des huizes (literally, "the man of the house"), etc. These are usually remnants of cases (in this instance, the genitive case which is still used in German, cf. Der Herr des Hauses) and other inflections no longer in general use today. In such lexicalized expressions remnants of strong and weak nouns can be found too, e.g. in het jaar des Heren (Anno Domini), where -en is actually the genitive ending of the weak noun. Similarly in some place names: ‌'s-Gravenbrakel, ‌'s-Hertogenbosch, etc. (with weak genitives of graaf "count", hertog "duke"). Also in this case, German retains this feature.

Word order
Dutch shares much of its word order with German. Dutch exhibits subject–object–verb word order, but in main clauses the conjugated verb is moved into the second position in what is known as verb second or V2 word order. This makes Dutch word order almost identical to that of German, but often different from English, which has subject–verb–object word order and has since lost the V2 word order that existed in Old English.

An example sentence used in some Dutch language courses and textbooks is "Ik kan mijn pen niet vinden omdat het veel te donker is", which translates into English word for word as "I can my pen not find because it far too dark is", but in standard English word order would be written "I cannot find my pen because it is far too dark". If the sentence is split into a main and subclause and the verbs highlighted, the logic behind the word order can be seen.

Main clause: "Ik kan mijn pen niet vinden"

Verb infinitives are placed in final position, but the finite, conjugated verb, in this case "kan" (can), is made the second element of the clause.

In subordinate clauses: "omdat het veel te donker is", the verb or verbs always go in the final position.

In an interrogative main clause the usual word order is: conjugated verb followed by subject; other verbs in final position:
"Kun jij je pen niet vinden?" (literally "Can you your pen not find?") "Can't you find your pen?"
In the Dutch equivalent of a wh-question the word order is: interrogative pronoun (or expression) + conjugated verb + subject; other verbs in final position:
"Waarom kun jij je pen niet vinden?" ("Why can you your pen not find?") "Why can't you find your pen?"
In a tag question the word order is the same as in a declarative clause:
"Jij kunt je pen niet vinden?" ("You can your pen not find?") "You can't find your pen?"
A subordinate clause does not change its word order:
"Kun jij je pen niet vinden omdat het veel te donker is?" ("Can you your pen not find because it far too dark is?") "Can you not find your pen because it's far too dark?"

Diminutives

In Dutch, the diminutive is used extensively. The nuances of meaning expressed by the diminutive are a distinctive aspect of Dutch, and can be difficult for non-native speakers to master. It is very productive and formed by adding one of the suffixes to the noun in question, depending on the latter's phonological ending:
 -je for ending in -b, -c, -d, -t, -f, -g, -ch, -k, -p, -v, -x, -z or -s: neef → neefje (male cousin, nephew)
 -pje for ending in -m: boom (tree) → boompje
 -kje for ending in -ing if the preceding syllable carries the stress: koning (king) → koninkje (the 'ng'-sound transforms into 'nk'); but ring → ringetje (ring), and vondeling → vondelingetje (foundling) without this stress pattern
 - for ending in -h, -j, -l, -n, -r, -w, or a vowel other than -y: zoen → zoen (kiss). A single open vowel is doubled when adding "-" would change the pronunciation: auto → autoo (car).
-′ for ending in -y and for abbreviations: baby → baby', cd → cd', A4 → A4'
 -etje for ending in -b, -l, -n, -ng or -r preceded by a "short" (lax) vowel: bal → balletje (ball). Final consonant is doubled (except for -ng) to preserve the vowel's shortness.

The diminutive suffixes -ke (from which - has derived by palatalization), -eke, -ske, - (only for words ending -ch, -k, -p, or -s), -kie (instead of -kje), and -pie (instead of -pje) are used in southern dialects, and the forms ending on - as well in northern urban dialects. Some of these form part of expressions that became standard language, like een makkie, from gemak = ease). The noun joch (young boy) has, exceptionally, only the diminutive form jochie, also in standard Dutch. The form -ke is also found in many women's given names: Janneke, Marieke, Marijke, Mieke, Meike etc.

In Dutch, the diminutive is not restricted to nouns, but can be applied to numerals (met z'n tweetjes, "the two of us"), pronouns (onderonsje, "tête-à-tête"), verbal particles (moetje, "shotgun marriage"), and even prepositions (toetje, "dessert"). Adjectives and adverbs commonly take diminutive forms; the former take a diminutive ending and thus function as nouns, while the latter remain adverbs and always have the diminutive with the -s appended, e.g. adjective: groen ("green") → noun: groen ("rookie"); adverb: even ("a while") → adverb: eventjes ("a little while").

Some nouns have two different diminutives, each with a different meaning: bloem (flower) → bloempje (lit. "small flower"), but bloemetje (lit. also "small flower", meaning bouquet). A few nouns exist solely in a diminutive form, e.g. zeepaardje (seahorse), while many, e.g. meisje (girl), originally a diminutive of meid (maid), have acquired a meaning independent of their non-diminutive forms. A diminutive can sometimes be added to an uncountable noun to refer to a single portion: ijs (ice, ice cream) → ijsje (ice cream treat, cone of ice cream), bier (beer) → biertje. Some diminutive forms only exist in the plural, e.g. kleertjes (clothing).

When used to refer to time, the Dutch diminutive form can indicate whether the person in question found it pleasant or not: een uurtje kletsen (chatting for a "little" hour.) The diminutive can, however, also be used pejoratively: Hij was weer eens het "mannetje". (He acted as if he was the "little" man.)

All diminutives (even lexicalised ones like "meisje" (girl)) have neuter gender and take neuter concords: "dit kleine meisje", not "deze kleine meisje".

Pronouns and determiners
There are two series of personal pronouns, subject and objects pronouns. The forms on the right-hand sides within each column are the unemphatic forms; those not normally written are given in brackets. Only ons and u do not have an unemphatic form. The distinction between emphatic and unemphatic pronouns is very important in Dutch. Emphatic pronouns in English use the reflexive pronoun form, but are used to emphasize the subject, not to indicate a direct or indirect object. For example, "I gave (to) myself the money" is reflexive but "I myself gave the money (to someone else) " is emphatic. 

Like English, Dutch has generalised the dative over the accusative case for all pronouns, e.g. NL 'me', 'je', EN 'me', 'you', vs. DE 'mich'/'mir' 'dich'/'dir'. There is one exception: the standard language prescribes that in the third person plural, hen is to be used for the direct object, and hun for the indirect object. This distinction was artificially introduced in the 17th century by grammarians, and is largely ignored in spoken language and not well understood by Dutch speakers. Consequently, the third person plural forms hun and hen are interchangeable in normal usage, with hun being more common. The shared unstressed form ze is also often used as both direct and indirect objects and is a useful avoidance strategy when people are unsure which form to use.

Dutch shares also with English the presence of h- pronouns, e.g. NL hij, hem, haar, hen, hun and EN he, him, her vs. DE er, ihn, ihr, ihnen.

Compounds

Like most Germanic languages, Dutch forms noun compounds, where the first noun modifies the category given by the second (hondenhok = doghouse). Unlike English, where newer compounds or combinations of longer nouns are often written in open form with separating spaces, Dutch (like the other Germanic languages) either uses the closed form without spaces (boomhut = tree house) or inserts a hyphen (VVD-coryfee = outstanding member of the VVD, a political party). Like German, Dutch allows arbitrarily long compounds, but the longer they get, the less frequent they tend to be.

Leafing through the articles of association (Statuten) one may come across a 30-letter  (authorisation of representation). An even longer word cropping up in official documents is ziektekostenverzekeringsmaatschappij (health insurance company) though the shorter zorgverzekeraar (health insurer) is more common.

Notwithstanding official spelling rules, some Dutch-speaking people, like some Scandinavians and German speakers, nowadays tend to write the parts of a compound separately, a practice sometimes dubbed de Engelse ziekte (the English disease).

Vocabulary 
Dutch vocabulary is predominantly Germanic in origin, with loanwords accounting for 20%. The main foreign influence on Dutch vocabulary since the 12th century and culminating in the French period has been French and (northern) Oïl languages, accounting for an estimated 6.8% of all words, or more than a third of all loanwords. Latin, which was spoken in the southern Low Countries for centuries and then played a major role as the language of science and religion, follows with 6.1%. High German and Low German were influential until the mid-20th century and account for 2.7%, but they are mostly unrecognizable since many have been "Dutchified": German  → Dutch . Dutch has borrowed words from English since the mid-19th century, as a consequence of the increasing power and influence of Britain and the United States. English loanwords are about 1.5%, but continue to increase. Many English loanwords become less visible over time as they are either gradually replaced by calques (skyscraper became Dutch wolkenkrabber) or neologisms (bucket list became loodjeslijst). Conversely, Dutch contributed many loanwords to English, accounting for 1.3% of its lexicon.

The main Dutch dictionary is the Van Dale groot woordenboek der Nederlandse taal, which contains some 268,826 headwords. In the field of linguistics, the 45,000-page Woordenboek der Nederlandsche Taal is also widely used. That scholarly endeavour took 147 years to complete and contains all recorded Dutch words from the Early Middle Ages onward.

Spelling and writing system

Dutch is written using the Latin script. Dutch uses one additional character beyond the standard alphabet, the digraph . It has a relatively high proportion of doubled letters, both vowels and consonants, due to the formation of compound words and also to the spelling devices for distinguishing the many vowel sounds in the Dutch language. An example of five consecutive doubled letters is the word  (food storage container). The diaeresis is used to mark vowels that are pronounced separately when involving a pre- or suffix, and a hyphen is used when the problem occurs in compound words, e.g  (influenced),  (the seas) but  (scoter; lit. sea duck). Generally, other diacritical marks occur only in loanwords. However, the acute accent can also be used for emphasis or to differentiate between two forms, and its most common use is to differentiate between the indefinite article   "a, an" and the numeral   "one".

Since the 1980s, the Dutch Language Union has been given the mandate to review and make recommendations on the official spelling of Dutch. Spelling reforms undertaken by the union occurred in 1995 and 2005. In the Netherlands, the official spelling is currently given legal basis by the Spelling Act of September 15, 2005. The Spelling Act gives the Committee of Ministers of the Dutch Language Union the authority to determine the spelling of Dutch by ministerial decision. In addition, the law requires that this spelling be followed "at the governmental bodies, at educational institutions funded from the public purse, as well as at the exams for which legal requirements have been established". In other cases, it is recommended, but it is not mandatory to follow the official spelling. The Decree on the Spelling Regulations 2005 of 2006 contains the annexed spelling rules decided by the Committee of Ministers on April 25, 2005. In Flanders, the same spelling rules are currently applied by the Decree of the Flemish Government Establishing the Rules of the Official Spelling and Grammar of the Dutch language of June 30, 2006.

Example text 
Article 1 of the Universal Declaration of Human Rights in Dutch:

Article 1 of the Universal Declaration of Human Rights in English:

All human beings are born free and equal in dignity and rights. They are endowed with reason and conscience and should act towards one another in a spirit of brotherhood.

See also

 Bargoens
 Dutch Braille
 Dutch grammar
 Dutch Language Union
 Dutch literature
 Dutch name
 Dutch orthography
 Dutch-based creole languages
 Flemish
 French Flemish
 Grand Dictation of the Dutch Language
 Indo-European languages
 Istvaeones
 List of English words of Dutch origin
 List of countries and territories where Afrikaans or Dutch are official languages
 Low Dietsch
 Low Franconian
 Meuse-Rhenish
 Middle Dutch
 Old Frankish
 Surinamese Dutch

Notes

Citations

General references 

 
 
 
 
 
 
 
 
 
 
 
 
 
 
 
 
 
 
 
 
 
 
 
 
 
 
 
 
 
 
 
 
 
 
 
 
 
 
 
 
 
 
 
 
 
 
 
 
 
 
 
 
 Maurer, Friedrich (1942), Nordgermanen und Alemannen: Studien zur germanischen und frühdeutschen Sprachgeschichte, Stammes- und Volkskunde, Strasbourg: Hünenburg.

External links

 
 The Nederlandse Taalunie, Dutch language union
 The Dutch Learner's Grammar, from The University of Sheffield

 
Articles containing video clips
Germanic languages
Languages of Belgium
Languages of Saint Martin (island)
Languages of the Dutch Caribbean
Languages of the Netherlands
Low Franconian languages
Stress-timed languages
Subject–object–verb languages
Standard languages
Verb-second languages